The Bolsheviks are Coming (1919) is a political leaflet written by Welsh communist and civil rights activist David Ivon Jones and co-authored by LHH Greene. The leaflet is notable for the arrest of its authors which sparked the first major court case against communism in South African history.

Written and distributed in the South African city of Pietermaritzburg, the leaflet was addressed 'to the workers of South Africa, Black as well as White'. Written in English, Zulu, and Sotho, The Bolsheviks are Coming! declared that:"While the Black worker is oppressed, the white worker cannot be free."The publishing of this leaflet would gain the attention of the South African government, which sought to censor its spread and punish the authors for promoting communism and racial equality. Both Jones and Greene were arrested, fined, and sentenced to four months in prison for the crime of publishing "The Bolsheviks are Coming!". However, this sentence was quashed on appeal. This court case is notable for being the first major court case against communism in South African history.

References 

Political literature
Opposition to apartheid in South Africa
Zulu literature
Sotho culture
Socialism in South Africa
Communism in South Africa
Pietermaritzburg
Social movements in South Africa